Kerstin Engle, born 1947, is a Swedish socialist politician who has been a member of the Riksdag since 2002.

External links
Kerstin Engle at the Riksdag website

1947 births
Living people
Members of the Riksdag from the Social Democrats
Women members of the Riksdag
Articles containing video clips
Members of the Riksdag 2002–2006
21st-century Swedish women politicians
Members of the Riksdag 2006–2010
Members of the Riksdag 2010–2014